Ibrahim Arifović (born 22 July 1990) is a Serbian footballer of Bosniak ethnicity, who plays for TB/FC Suðuroy/Royn.

Club career
Born in Novi Pazar, SR Serbia, back then still within Yugoslavia, he played many years with his local club FK Novi Pazar in the Serbian SuperLiga. In first semester of 2015 he played with FK Berane in Montenegrin First League. Next season he played the first 6 months with KS Kastrioti in Albanian Superliga. Later he returned to Berane and after the first half of the 2016–17 season he spent with Jošanica in the Serbian League West, he joined his home Novi Pazar for the third time at the beginning of 2017. On 31 January 2018, Arifović signed a one-year contract with TB/FC Suðuroy/Royn.

References

External links
 Ibrahim Arifović stats at utakmica.rs
 
 
 Ibrahim Arifović at FuPa
 Ibrahim Arifović at SFF

1990 births
Living people
Sportspeople from Novi Pazar
Bosniaks of Serbia
Serbian footballers
Serbian expatriate footballers
FK Novi Pazar players
Serbian First League players
Serbian SuperLiga players
FK Berane players
KS Kastrioti players
KSF Prespa Birlik players
Montenegrin First League players
Kategoria Superiore players
Serbian expatriate sportspeople in Albania
Expatriate footballers in Albania
Serbian expatriate sportspeople in Germany
Expatriate footballers in Germany
Serbian expatriate sportspeople in Sweden
Expatriate footballers in Sweden
Serbian expatriate sportspeople in the Faroe Islands
Expatriate footballers in the Faroe Islands
Association football fullbacks
Age controversies